Margarete Karoline "Grete" Merrem-Nikisch (7 July 1887 – 12 March 1970) was a German operatic  soprano.

Life 

Born in Düren, Merrem-Nikisch first studied with Rudolf Schulz-Dornburg in Cologne and then at the renowned Königlichen Konservatorium in Leipzig, where she also made her debut in 1910 at the Leipzig Opera. One year later she gave her first guest performance at the Berlin Court Opera as a goose maid in Humperdinck's opera Königskinder. In 1913 she was engaged by the Semperoper in Dresden and took part in several premieres there: in 1916 she played the slave Arsinoë in Albert's opera Die toten Augen, in 1917 the title role in Hans Pfitzner's opera Das Christ-Elflein, in 1926 the Lady in Hindemith's Cardillac. During this time she occasionally performed abroad, for example at the Royal Opera House in Covent Garden, where she sang the role of Eva in Wagner's Die Meistersinger von Nürnberg in 1914; the performance was conducted by her father-in-law Arthur Nikisch.

Merrem-Nikisch documented her versatility with a spectrum from tragic opera (among others the title role in Puccini's Madama Butterfly and the role of Irene in Wagner's Rienzi) to operetta (Die Fledermaus, The Merry Widow). She celebrated great successes in several Mozart roles, such as Dorabella in Così fan tutte, Zerlina in Don Giovanni and Susanna in Le nozze di Figaro. In 1930 she took the part of Veronika in Jan Brandts-Buys′ opéra comique  and said goodbye to the stage. After that she was appointed an honorary member of the Dresden Opera.

Recordings were made with well-known Dresden and Berlin artists such as Karin Branzell, Meta Seinemeyer and Richard Tauber. She can be heard in an acoustic Polydor production of Strauss' autobiographical opera Intermezzo. In 1924, shortly after the premiere of the work in Dresden, she took over the role of Christine from her colleague Lotte Lehmann.

In 1914 Merrem-Nikisch married the well-known jurist , whose memoirs she published in 1969 under the title Wissenschaft und Kunst.

Merren-Nikisch died in Kiel.

Bibliography 
 Karl-Josef Kutsch, Leo Riemens: Merrem-Nikisch, Grete. In Großes Sängerlexikon. 3rd edition, München 1997–2000, vol. 3, 
 Elizabeth Forbes: Grete Merrem-Nikisch. In Laura Williams Lacy (editor): The Grove Book of Opera Singers. Oxford University Press, Oxford 2008, 

References

External links 

 Grete Merrem-Nikisch
 

1887 births
1970 deaths
People from Düren
German operatic sopranos
20th-century German women opera singers